The 1980 Florida Federal Open was a women's tennis tournament played on outdoor hard courts at the East Lake Woodlands Racquet Club in Tampa, Florida in the United States that was part of the Colgate Series circuit of the 1980 WTA Tour and classified as category AAA. It was the eighth edition of the tournament and was held from November 10 through November 16, 1980. Second-seeded Andrea Jaeger won the singles title and earned $22,000 first-prize money after first-seeded Tracy Austin withdrew before the final with an injury to her left hamstring.

Finals

Singles
 Andrea Jaeger defeated  Tracy Austin walkover
 It was Jaeger's 4th singles title of the year and of her career.

Doubles
 Rosie Casals /  Candy Reynolds defeated  Anne Smith /  Paula Smith 7–6, 7–5

Prize money

References

External links
 International Tennis Federation (ITF) tournament edition details

Eckerd Open
Florida Federal Open
Florida Federal Open
20th century in Tampa, Florida
Sports competitions in Tampa, Florida
Florida Federal Open
Florida Federal Open